Zurab Shervashidze (also known as Suraba Bey) was the ruler of Abkhazia around 1770–1780. He was the youngest son of Manuchar, Prince of Abkhazia.

Zurab was banished, along with his father and brothers, by the Sultan of Turkey 1757. He later joined his brother in the revolt against Turkish rule, but was deposed by his nephew in 1779 or 1780.

References

Princes of Abkhazia
House of Shervashidze
Converts to Islam from Eastern Orthodoxy
Former Georgian Orthodox Christians
Date of birth unknown
Date of death unknown